Zimina volcano or Zimin is a stratovolcano located in the central part of  the Kamchatka Peninsula, Russia. It comprises two peaks: Ovalnaya Zimina and Ostraya Zimina.

View

See also
 List of volcanoes in Russia
 List of ultras of Northeast Asia

References

Sources
 
 

Mountains of the Kamchatka Peninsula
Volcanoes of the Kamchatka Peninsula
Stratovolcanoes of Russia